Sandra Anne Easterbrook (née James; 12 March 1946 — 18 November 2019) was a New Zealand netball player. She represented her country in the 1967 World Netball Championships, when  won the gold medal for the first time.

Biography
Easterbrook was born Sandra Anne James on 12 March 1946, and came from the Northland Region.

Representing Northland at netball, James was selected as the 41st player to represent the New Zealand national team, and played in two matches during the 1967 world championships in Perth, Western Australia, before a back injury ruled her out of the remainder of the tournament. At , Easterbrook was the tallest player on the team, and played in the position of wing defence (WD). The New Zealand team won all seven of their games at the tournament, including defeating  40–34 in their final game, to win the world championship title for the first time. 
 
James married Roger Easterbrook, and had two daughters and a son. She became a teacher at Kamo Intermediate School in Whangārei, in 1967, staying there until 1976. Her daughter, Suzy, who attended the same school, represented New Zealand at beach volleyball and is now a beach volleyball coach.

Easterbrook died on 18 November 2019.

References

1946 births
2019 deaths
New Zealand international netball players
1967 World Netball Championships players
Sportspeople from Whangārei